Les Mains libres (The Free Hands) is a 2010 French drama film directed by Brigitte Sy. It stars Ronit Elkabetz, Carlo Brandt, and Noémie Lvovsky. It was released theatrically in France on 16 June 2010. It is a feature-length prequel to Sy's 2008 short film, L'Endroit idéal.

Plot

Barbara (Elkabetz) is a filmmaker developing a film written and acted by prison inmates in Paris. She defies legal boundaries, unleashing a series of consequences when she forms a deep romantic relationship with Michel (Brandt), an inmate involved in the film project.

Cast
Ronit Elkabetz as Barbara
Carlo Brandt as Michel
Noémie Lvovsky as Rita
Camille Figuereo as Chloé
Adama Doumbia as Roel
Denis Maréchal as Fifi
Gurgon Kyap as James
Abdelhafid Metalsi as Mouloud
Xavier Legrand as Laurent
Ahmed M'Hemdi as Bouda
François Négret as Sergueï
Alain Ollivier as Le directeur de la prison
Sasha Andres as Marie-Pierre
Dominique Frot as La juge
Brigitte Sy as Le femme blonde

Reception
Thomas Baurez of L'Express, described it as "intelligent, gracious and humble.. a love story of the purest sense of the term." Lucie Calet of Le Nouvel Observateur, continued that it is a "Greek tragedy" of "great dignity." Le Figaro praised the depiction of the tangible reality of the film as well as Eliabetz' superb and dark performance, evoking traits of the Madonna.

The film was warmly received by The New Yorker; "with calm and nuanced images, Sy captures emotionally unguarded characters locked in the gaze of prying eyes; with brusque, quiet action and incisive, tight-lipped dialogue, she sets a gripping plot in motion while keeping it close to the heart."

References

External links

French radio interview with Ronit Elkabetz

2010 films
2010s French-language films
HIV/AIDS in French films
Features based on short films
Films set in France
Films set in Paris
Films shot in Paris
French prison films
Films directed by Brigitte Sy
2010 directorial debut films
2010 drama films
2010s French films